Namma Metro ("Our Metro" in Kannada), also known as Bengaluru Metro, is a rapid transit system serving the city of Bengaluru, India. It is the 3rd largest operational metro network in India after Delhi and Hyderabad metro. Upon its inauguration, it became the first underground metro system in South India. Namma Metro has a mix of underground, at grade, and elevated stations. Out of the operational 52 metro stations of Namma Metro as of November 2022, there are 43 elevated stations, 8 underground stations and 1 at-grade station. The system runs on standard-gauge tracks.

Bengaluru Metro Rail Corporation Limited (BMRCL), a joint venture of Government of India and the State Government of Karnataka, is the agency for building, operating and expanding the Namma Metro network. Services operate daily between 05:00 and 24:00 running with a headway varying between 2–4 minutes. The trains initially began with three coaches but were later converted to six coaches as ridership grew. Power is supplied by 750 kilo volt direct current through third rail. As of January 2020, the metro system had an average daily ridership of about 1,000,000 passengers.

History

The State Town Planning Department had recommended looking into a mass rapid transit project, i.e. a metro for Bangalore city way back in 1977. A high-level Committee had also agreed that a metro study was warranted and a team from Southern Railway (SR) was commissioned to do this in 1981. The Southern Railway team recommended a 2-corridor metro,  in length in addition to commuter rail lines and a ring railway.

In 1993, the State of Karnataka established another committee to look into mass rapid transit. This committee had again recommended the same metro project put forward by SR in 1983 and the same circular railway.

The state created Bangalore Mass Rapid Transit Ltd (BMRTL) in 1994, with terms of reference to seek a public/private partnership for a mass rapid transit project. The government immediately introduced a special city cess dedicated to the anticipated mass rapid transit project. A private consortium led by United Breweries Group undertook further development of the project on BOT basis. However, the project hadn't taken off.

In 2003, the Government of Karnataka commissioned the Delhi Metro Rail Corporation (DMRC), which had successfully developed the Delhi Metro, to carry out a detailed preparation study for a metro in Bangalore, to be done emulating the technical and financial aspects of the approach used in Delhi. The middle of the cross was to be at the Central Railway Station in Bangalore, completely underground. The economic rate-of-return was forecast at 22.3%. The financial forecast assumes a government subsidy for interest payments and some depreciation, i.e. fare revenue will cover somewhat more than direct operating costs. The Government accepted this option. BMRTL ceased to exist and was replaced by Bangalore Metro Rail Corporation Ltd (BMRCL).

Network

Namma Metro lines

Purple Line 

Purple Line is aligned east to west and connects Baiyappanahalli in the east with Kengeri in the southwest. It is elevated on both east and west sides and has a  underground section in the middle. The Line passes through prime activity centers of the city (MG Road, Majestic, Railway Station, Vidhana Soudha etc.). It is currently being expanded under Phase-2.

The first , 6-station stretch (Reach 1) of the Purple Line between Baiyappanahalli in the east and Mahatma Gandhi Road opened on 20 October 2011. This was the inaugural section of Namma Metro. The second , 6-station stretch (Reach 2) between Mysore Road and Magadi Road opened on 16 November 2015. The underground section, a  stretch from Cubbon Park to Bengaluru City (KSR) Railway Station opened on 29 April 2016, thus linking east and west sections that were already opened. Opening the underground section completed the entire Purple Line in Phase-1. A  extension on the south west opened on 30 August 2021 under phase-2.

Green Line 

It is elevated on both north and south sides and has a  underground section in the middle. The Line passes through industrial areas (Peenya, Yeshwanthapur) in the north and also through commercial hubs (Majestic, Chikpete, City Market) and connects large residential catchments in the south (Basavanagudi, Jayanagar, Banashankari etc.). It is currently being expanded under Phase-2.

The first , 10-station stretch (Reach 3/3A) of the Green Line opened 1 March 2014. The stretch connected Sampige Road to Peenya Industry. The second , 3-station stretch (Reach 3B) of the Green Line from Peenya Industry to Nagasandra, opened on 1 May 2015. The third stretch connecting Sampige Road to Yelachenahalli was inaugurated on 17 June 2017 and opened the next day, thereby completing the entire Phase 1. These stretches (including the underground section) were inaugurated by then President late Shri Pranab Mukherjee on 17 March 2017. The  stretch from Yelachenahalli to Silk Institute was inaugurated on 14 January 2021, making it the first section of Phase-2 to be opened for service.

Section details and opening dates

Operational Lines

[b] Discrepancies in total number of stations is due to an interchange station that is counted once for each line.

Lines Under Construction in Phase 2

More lines and extensions are under construction. When completed, the 2nd phase (currently underway) will provide connectivity to the city's tech hubs of Electronic City and Whitefield, besides covering the eastern half of Outer Ring Road (ORR) and providing service to the Kempegowda International Airport in the north of the city.

Yellow Line 

This line is completely elevated and runs along ORR and Hosur road. It will begin at an interchange station (Rashtreeya Vidyalaya Road) and pass through two other interchange stations: Jayadeva hospital station, which will be an interchange station with the Pink Line; and Central Silk Board station, a planned interchange station with the Blue Line. Thus, the line connects Electronic City and Bommasandra industrial area with the metro network. The line is scheduled to become operational around December 2023.

On 9 June 2022, Karnataka Government okayed preparation of DPR by Tamil Nadu government for an extension of the Yellow line from Bommasandra to Hosur in Tamil Nadu.

Pink Line 

It is elevated on the southern side till Tavarakere, the rest is underground till the northern end at Nagawara station. The line will pass through Jayadeva station (interchange with Yellow Line) and Mahatma Gandhi Road (interchange with Purple Line). it passes through Cantonment and ends at Nagawara, which is planned as an interchange station with the Blue Line. The line is under construction and is expected to open in 2025–26.

Blue Line 

This Blue Line is aligned along the eastern and northern sections of ORR. It deviates from ORR at Hebbal and proceeds along Airport road to Kempegowda International Airport. Construction is being handled in two sections: Phase-2A covers Central Silk Board to Krishnarajapuram and Phase-2B covers Krishnarajapuram to Airport. It is elevated almost throughout with a small underground section in way of Yelahanka Airforce base. The line also has a section at grade level closer to the airport. Airport station will be an underground station. This line begins at Central Silk Board (interchange with Yellow line), and passes through Krishnarajapuram (interchange station with Purple Line) and Nagawara (interchange station with Pink line). It also passes through Hebbal and Yelahanka. The under construction line is expected to open in 2 phases (Phase-2A in June-2025 and Phase-2B in December- 2025). In June 2022, BMRCL launched the first ever U Girder span on ORR-Airport metro line.

Construction

Phase 1

Delhi Metro Rail Corporation Limited (DMRC) prepared and submitted the detailed project for the first phase of Namma Metro in May 2003. The DPR was for a  network with 32 stations for Phase 1 of the project, using standard gauge. The project was approved by the Union Cabinet on 25 April 2006. The foundation stone for construction of Phase 1 was laid by then Prime Minister Dr. Manmohan Singh on 24 June 2006. Navayuga Engineering Company Limited was awarded the first contract to construct Reach 1 of the east–west corridor in 2006. Civil construction on the first section (Reach-1) of the Purple Line between Baiyyappanahalli and Mahatma Gandhi Road, commenced on 15 April 2007.

DPRs for a northern extension (from Yeshwanthapura to Nagasandra) and a southern extension (from Rashtreeya Vidyalaya Road to Yelachenahalli) was submitted in October 2007 and June 2008 respectively. With these extensions, the total route length for phase-1 became . The objective was to connect the metro to the Outer Ring Road at northern and southern ends, and also cover the industrial areas of Peenya in the north-west, thereby providing better connectivity and increasing ridership. In October 2008, the Government of Karnataka approved this extension, which would cost an additional ₹1,763 crore (US$250 million).

Underground section 
Both lines in Phase-1 have tunnel sections in the city center which were the first metro tunnels built in South India. Construction of underground sections in Phase 1 commenced during late 2012. The delay was due to cancellation of the initial tenders called during early 2008 as the entire DPR had to be revised and bids received were too high. A second round of tendering was done in late 2009 with the gigantic Majestic inter-change station as a separate package. Bids were awarded for the tunnel sections during 2011 and construction began in 2012.

The TBMs were nicknamed Helen, Margarita, Kaveri, Krishna and Godavari.

Tunnel boring of underground section UG1 (on east–west corridor) was completed on 17 March 2014. The entire stretch of the Purple Line was opened on 29 April 2016.

Tunnel boring of underground section UG2 (on north–south corridor) was completed on 23 September 2016. The tunneling faced a major delay when the cutter head of TBM Godavari was broken and spares had to be awaited. The entire stretch of Green Line was opened on 19 June 2017, thus completing phase-1 of the project.

Opening 
After missing deadlines, Namma Metro's first section (Reach-1) had finally opened to the public on 20 October 2011. There was an overwhelming response by the public at commencement of operations. As per BMRCL sources, within the first 3 days of operations 169,019 people rode the metro. At the end of the 4th day, about 200,000 passengers had already commuted on Namma Metro. Namma Metro's first 12-day cumulative revenue was ₹1 crore (US$100,000).

The northern section of Green Line (Reach 3,3A,3B) was initially scheduled to be opened by the end of 2012. However, it was delayed and finally opened on 1 March 2014. BMRCL MD Pradeep Singh Kharola stated that about 25,000 passengers travelled on the line on the opening day. In the first month of operations, 7.62 lakh people used the line, at an average of 24,605 daily, generating revenues of ₹1.5 crore (US$210,000).

The first underground section (on the Purple line) commenced operations on 30 April 2016, thus providing through connectivity between east and west of the city.

The second underground section, along with southern reaches (viz. Reach 4,4A) was opened on 18 June 2017.

Once the east and west reaches were inter-connected with opening of the underground section of the purple line, ridership surged hugely. After the north–south underground section was opened (simultaneously with the elevated reach 4,4A in the south), the network provided connectivity in all four directions with interchange between the lines and this further increased ridership. Ridership kept increasing and was around 4,50,000 daily (September 2019).

Phase 1 lines and sections 

There are 40 stations in Phase 1, of which 7 stations are underground, 1 at grade and 32 are elevated.

The first phase of the project was initially budgeted at ₹6,395 crore (US$875 million). With route extensions and cost escalation, this was later revised to ₹11,609 crores (US$1.6 billion). There were many delays during construction and as a result, there were several postponements. The difficult geological conditions below ground with a mix of soft soil, high groundwater levels, hard granite and large boulders was a major impediment for tunnel boring. A major delay was due to a broken cutter head of TBM Godavari for which spares had to be ordered from Italy. Phase 1, containing 2 lines aggregating  was completed and services opened to public on 19-June-2017. The final costs for phase-1 were ₹14,405 crores.

Phase 2 
The State Government accorded approval for preparation of the detailed project report (DPR) for Phase 2 by DMRC on 4 January 2011. The high power committee (HPC) gave in-principle clearance to proceed with Phase 2 in July 2011. Karnataka government gave in-principle approval to Phase 2 of the Namma Metro project on 3 January 2012. However, there were delays in DPR preparation and hence approval from Central government. Phase 2 was cleared by the expenditure finance committee (EFC) in August 2013. The Union Cabinet finally announced that it had approved plans for phase-2 on 30 January 2014.

The estimated total cost for Phase 2 was around ₹26,405 crore (US$3.7 billion) at 2011-12 price levels. The State Government would contribute ₹9,000 crore (US$1.3 billion). The project cost of ₹26,405 at 2011–12 price levels is set to escalate about 5 per cent every year with increasing cost of inputs. The Union government will share that part of cost escalation due to increase in central levies, while the State and BMRCL will have to bear any other escalation. The total project cost for Phase 2 is estimated to reach at least ₹30,000 crore (US$4.2 billion) at start of construction itself. In October 2018, Deputy Chief Minister G Parameshwara stated that the cost of Phase 2 would be around ₹32,000 crore (US$4.5 billion).

Phase 2 spans a length of  underground,  at grade and  elevated, and adds 62 stations to the network, of which 12 are underground. Phase 2 includes extension of the two Phase 1 lines in both directions, as well as construction of two new lines.

The south-end of the Green Line will be extended from Yelachenahalli to Silk Institute (previously named Anjanapura) along Kanakapura Road, north-end from Nagasandra to Madavara (previously named BIEC) on Tumkur Road (NH-4). The east-end of the Purple Line will be extended from Baiyappanahalli to Whitefield and the west-end from Mysore Road to Kengeri (later extended to Challaghatta). The second new line will be  from Kalena Agrahara (previously Gottigere) to Nagawara. There are 18 stations on the line, of which 12 are underground and 6 are elevated. Unlike Phase 1, all stations being built in Phase 2 will have bus bays and/or parking facilities.

Karnataka Industrial Areas Development Board (KIADB) is responsible for acquiring land for Phase 2. It was estimated that  of land would be required for Phase 2 (including Phase 2A). By April 2017, BMRCL had already spent ₹5000 crore on land acquisition.

Construction work began on the south extension of the Green Line from Yelachenahalli to Silk Institute (6.29 km or 3.91 mi) and the west extension of the Purple Line from Mysore Road to Kengeri (8.81 km or 5.47 mi) by October 2016. Construction work on the west extension of Purple Line was awarded in two packages for ₹660 crore, while the Green Line south extension was awarded in a single package for ₹508.86 crore.

Construction work for the north extension of the Green Line (from Nagasandra to Madavara) and the east extension of the Purple Line (from Baiyyappanahalli to Whitefield) began in July 2017.

Construction of the yellow line, a new line from Rashtreeya Vidyalaya Road to Bommasandra in 3 packages began post awarding of tenders in November 2017. The first package was a stretch from Bommasandra to Hosa Road station, including depot entry line to Hebbagodi depot and five Metro stations. The second package was for a  stretch from Hosa Road to Bommanahalli (previously HSR Layout). Both packages were awarded for ₹1,750 crore (US$250 million) to Thailand-based ITD Cementation India. The third package was for a stretch from RV Road to Bommanahalli (previously HSR Layout), 6.34 km long elevated section and 5 stations, for ₹797.29 crores (US$110 million) and includes the construction of a road-cum-rail flyover, road widening and allied works.

Construction of the 7.5 km elevated section of a new pink line between Kalena Agrahara and Tavarekere (previously Swagat Road Cross) stations, estimated to cost ₹575.52 crore (US$81 million) began post tendering in February 2018. The tender includes the construction of the elevated viaduct, 5 stations and car depot line to Kothanur depot.

Underground section 
BMRC initially floated tenders for the construction of the 13.9 km underground section in four packages during June 2017. However, the tenders were cancelled as all the bids received were far too high (higher by nearly 70%) at Rs.8553.45 core (US$1.28 billion) when compared to BMRC's estimated total of Rs 5047.56 core (about US$760 million).

The second round of tendering resulted in tenders being awarded to three firms during March–June period, 2019. One of the firms (L&T) won two bids.

The total awarded tunneling tenders for the underground sections was ₹5,925.95 crores (appx US$812 million).

Pre-tunneling construction work and piling for stations began in May 2019 by L&T. Tunnel boring using TBMs began in July 2020 by L&T. Tunnel boring work by the other two contractors (viz. Afcons & ITD-Cem) was commenced during 2021.

Phase 2A 
In September 2016, then-Chief Minister of Karnataka Siddaramaiah announced that a new  line connecting Silk Board with K.R.Puram would be included in Phase 2 as Phase-2A of the project. The line would be along the eastern half of Outer Ring Road and is proposed to have 13 stations – Silk Board, HSR Layout, Agara, Ibbalur, Bellandur, Kadubeesanahalli, Kodibisanahalli, Marathahalli, ISRO, Doddanekundi, DRDO Sports Complex, Sarasvathi Nagara (previously Mahadevapura) and K.R. Puram. The cost was estimated to be ₹4202 crores. BMRCL prepared the detailed project report for the proposed line and submitted the DPR to the state government on 28 October 2016. Phase 2A was approved by the State Cabinet on 1 March 2017. The ORR Metro line (Blue line) will have interchange stations with the extended Purple Line at K.R.Puram and with the proposed R V Road – Bommasandra line (Yellow Line) at Silk Board.

Tenders for ORR Metro line (east) were called during February 2018 and IL&FS emerged the lowest bidder for all packages. However, the tenders were quashed due to cash flow problems and bankruptcy proceedings by the firm. A second round of tendering was done during December 2019 and bids were received by multiple firms during March 2020. There are two packages. The first package included 2.84 km of ramps for a flyover at Central Silk board junction in addition to 9.859 km of viaduct with six elevated stations. The second package was for 8.377 km viaduct with seven elevated stations, 1.097 km depot line and a 0.30 km pocket track.

Phase 2B 
This was to be executed by an independent SPV, but later it was decided that BMRC would manage this project and a regular metro line with fewer halts would be built instead of a high speed rail, thus travel time between city to airport would be less. As early as in February 2012, the Central Government had also requested BMRC to start work on the airport link during Phase 2 itself.

Following this, during September 2016, suggestions were invited from public to choose any one of nine possible extension routes from existing and proposed metro lines to the airport. A  extension from Nagawara via Kannur and Bagaluru was the shortest, while the  extension from Yeshwanthpur via Yelahanka, Kannur and Bagaluru was the longest of the proposed routes. BMRC received 1,300 responses from the public. A  extension of the Kalena Agrahara (previously Gottigere) – Nagawara line via Kannur and Bagaluru to the airport emerged as the most popular choice.

Since Bangalore International Airport Limited (BIAL) forbade underground construction from the southern side of the airport (due to security as it would have to pass beneath the airport's second runway), the shortest route options (i.e. extending the Pink line from Nagawara directly north) were eliminated. An alternate route proceeding north till RK Hegde nagar and then turning west to Jakkur was then explored. However, even this had an obstacle as a high-pressure petroleum pipeline was passing through the originally proposed route.

Bangalore Development Minister K. J. George announced on 12 May 2017 that the government had finalized the Nagawara-Ramakrishna Hegde Nagar-Jakkur-Yelahanka route to the airport. On 10 January 2019, the State Cabinet approved a change in alignment for the proposed metro line to the airport. The new line would begin at Krishnarajapura (K.R. Puram) and be aligned along the northern part of ORR (Outer Ring Road), passing Nagawara, Hebbal, and Jakkur before heading towards the airport along Ballari road. It is estimated to cost ₹10,584 crore (US$1.5 billion) almost twice as much as the previous route's estimate of ₹5,950 crore (US$830 million).

The Union Cabinet cleared two much awaited lines of the Bengaluru Metro's Phase-2A and 2B on 20 April 2021. Phase-2A and Phase 2B lines total a distance of 58.19 km and were approved at a cost of Rs.14,788 crore. The projected ridership on both these lines in 2026 is estimated at 7.7 lakhs. Construction of the airport line is expected to begin by October 2021. In January 2023, there was an accident when an reinforcement cage of the under-construction metro pier fell on a woman software engineer, Tejaswini Sulakhe and her son Vihan in HBR Layout, which led to their eventual death. BMRCL announced a financial assistance of  20 lakh. Chief Minister Basavaraj Bommai also announced a separate compensation of Rs 10 lakh for each of the deaths from the Chief Ministers’ Relief Fund.

Phase 2, 2A, and 2B lines and sections 

Phase 2 originally involved extending four reaches of the two lines in all directions and two new lines (Yellow Line and Pink Line).

The ORR-East Line was later included as Phase 2A followed by the Airport Line (as a continuation of the ORR-East Line) as Phase-2B. The line was later named as Blue Line.

Construction of Phase 2 has been divided into six (elevated) reach extensions and four underground sections. Construction of Phase 2A has been divided into two (elevated section) packages. Construction of Phase 2B has been divided into three (elevated section) packages. Airport stations have not been included with tenders as they will likely be built by Kempegowda International Airport.

Progress on Construction 

List of contracts for various sections under construction is as per table below:

Finances

Funding

Phase 1

Phase 1 missed nine deadlines, and its cost was revised four times. Delays caused further escalations.

The Central and State Government funded 58.91% of the cost. The remaining 41.09% was secured through loans from domestic and foreign financial institutions. BMRCL secured loans from several agencies –  from the Japan International Cooperation Agency (JICA),  from the Housing and Urban Development Corporation Limited (HUDCO),  from the Asian Development Bank (ADB), and the rest from the French Development Agency. Approximately 10% of the 6500 crore had to be paid as interest by the BMRCL each year.

BMRCL announced plans on 13 June 2013 to issue 10-year bonds. The proposed bonds received a credit rating of "IND AA" from India Ratings & Research (Ind-Ra). Namma Metro MD N. Sivasailam announced on 3 August 2013 that the issue of bonds would be postponed as the market was volatile. He stated that the metro would "be in the market soon when it is stable".

Phase 2 /2A /2B
Phase 2 is estimated to cost . The Central and State Governments will fund around 15,000 crore. The State and Central Governments will bear 30% and 20% of the project cost respectively. The remaining will be obtained through senior term loans. BMRCL is permitted to raise up to 9,000 crore through loans.

On 27 March 2012, Asian Development Bank (ADB) signed an agreement to lend $250 million to BMRC to part-finance Phase 2. The loan marked the multilateral lending agency's foray into the urban transport sector in South Asia, the ADB said in a press release. The loan, approved by the ADB Board in March 2011, is the first ADB loan to the urban transport sector without recourse to sovereign guarantees. In 2016, the Agence Francaise De Development (AFD) sanctioned a 1,600 crore loan for the project. The rate of interest on the loan is linked to Euro Interbank Offered Rate (Euribor) + 130 basis points. In early 2017, the European Investment Bank agreed to loan 3,700 crore to BMRCL, with a repayment period of 20 years at a rate of interest lower than the one on the AFD loan.

In May 2017, BMRC received in-principle approval from the European Investment Bank (EIB) to fund construction of the Gottigere-Nagawara line through a 3700 crore loan. The line is being co-financed by the Asian Infrastructure Investment Bank and the Central and State Governments.

Indian firms Biocon and Infosys announced that they would provide funding for the construction of the Hebbagodi and Electronics City metro stations respectively on the RV Road-Bommasandra Metro line. BMRC expects that each firm will contribute  towards the project. Biocon CMD Kiran Mazumdar Shaw stated that the company wanted to fund the project because it would help decongest the city. Both Biocon and Infosys have offices located near the stations.

BMRCL secured a $318 million loan from JICA in March 2021, and a $500 million loan from the ADB in August 2021 to fund construction of the ORR-Airport metro. The State and Union governments will contribute , and the Karnataka Government will pay an additional  for land acquisition.

Revenues
During the first month since the opening of Reach I of just 6.7 km, about 13,25,000 people travelled by metro. However, during the first six months of operation, average ridership went down to 24,968. The BMRC earned a total of  during the same period. Namma Metro posted a profit of  after about one year of operations of Reach I. BMRCL estimates that nearly 80 lakh passengers travelled on the system in its first year of operations. Namma metro is also pursuing selling retail space within the metro stations to generate non-fare revenue.

The following table shows annual ridership and farebox revenue of Namma Metro since inception.

Infrastructure

Rolling stock
BMRC procured 150 metro coaches for fifty 3-car train sets in DMC-TC-DMC formation for Phase l of Namma Metro from BEML - Hyundai Rotem at a cost of Rs 1,672.50 crore (Rs 16.72 billion). Coach specifications were as follows. Dimensions: Length-20.8m, Width-2.88m, and Height-3.8m. Each coach had a seating capacity of about 50 and standing capacity of 306 (basis 8 per sqm). Thus, each train had a capacity of about 1000. Traction is through four 180 kW motors in each motor coach. The trains have a maximum speed of 80 kmph and axle load of 15 tonnes. The trains operate on 750V DC with third rail bottom power collector system. Features include stainless steel body fully air-conditioned coaches, longitudinal bank of wide seats, wide vestibules between coaches, non-skid and non-slip floor surfaces, wi-fi enabled, four wide passenger access doors on each side, wide windows, automatic voice announcement system and electronic information and destination display system.

Thus, initial operations began with 3-coach trains. Each train had a capacity of 1000 passengers. As loads increased with increasing ridership, all trains were converted to six coaches.

The first train set made a trial run in December 2010. In early 2017, BMRC floated tenders for an additional 150 coaches to convert all trains to 6 coach trains on the two Phase 1 routes. On 27 March 2017, BEML announced that it had won an 1,421 crore contract to supply the coaches. The first six car train was introduced on the Purple Line on 23 June 2018. By January 2020, all trains had been converted to six coaches.

Free Wi-Fi service was made available to commuters on 31 July 2013. Passengers also have emergency voice communication with train staff through a speaker system. Passengers are provided with a call button to communicate with the driver or control center during an emergency.

Power supply
In December 2009, the ABB Group was awarded the contract to provide power solutions for the first phase of the planned metro network. ABB designed, supplied, installed and commissioned four substations that receive and distribute electricity, each rated at 66/33 kV, as well as the auxiliary and traction substations. ABB also provided an integrated network management system, or SCADA (Supervisory Control And Data Acquisition), to monitor and control the installations. BMRC currently pays BESCOM 5.7 per unit of electricity.

In 2016, BMRCL signed an agreement with CleanMax Solar to set up solar installations at Baiyapanahalli and Peenya stations. After Phase 2 of the metro is complete, CleanMax Solar will set up similar installations at the metro depots in Challaghatta, Whitefield, Kothanur and Hebbagodi. Per the agreement, CleanMax Solar will bear the cost of installation and the BMRC will pay CleanMax a rate of 5.5 per unit of electricity for three years. Following the three-year period, all six installations will be transferred to the BMRC. According to the BMRC director of operations NM Dhoke, "The 1.4 MW installation can generate up to 10,000 units, which help power the depot facilities. However, it is not sufficient to power the trains, but it will help us save 51 crore over 25 years on energy".

In February 2019, Alstom was awarded a GBP 62 million contract to provide electrification systems for Phase II of the Namma Metro. The company will construct 56 substations to supply power for Phase II of the system.

Signaling
In September 2009, the consortium led by Alstom Project India Limited was awarded a contract worth  to supply control and signalling system for the first phase of the project. The consortium is led by Alstom and composed of Alstom Transport SA, Thales Group Portugal S A, and Sumitomo Corporation. Alstom will provide the design, manufacture, supply, installing, testing, and commissioning of the train control and signalling system and Thales will provide the design, installing, testing, and commissioning of the telecommunication system for Phase 1 of the metro system. It includes the Urbalis 200 Automatic Train Control system which will ensure optimal safety, flexible operations and heightened passenger comfort.

The integrated control center at Baiyyappanahalli has direct communication with trains and stations are CCTV fitted with visual and audio service information. Passengers have emergency voice communication with train staff.

Stations

There are 51 stations on the Namma Metro network.

Initially, there were no toilets at Namma Metro stations. BMRCL eventually heeded public demand, and the metro's first toilets were opened at Baiyappanahalli and Indiranagar stations on 21 June 2013. As of February 2017, there were 33 ATMs at Namma Metro stations.

The 12 underground stations built during Phase II will be smaller in size than the underground stations built in Phase I to minimise land acquisition costs. All Phase I underground stations were 272 meters long and 24 meters wide, except for Chickpet and K.R. Market stations which had the same width but were 240 meters long. In contrast, Phase II's underground stations are shorter at 210 meters but retain the same width.

On 17 February 2017, Uber announced that it would open booking counters at 12 metro stations by the end of March 2017. The counters enable commuters to book an Uber, and is aimed at commuters who do not have access to the internet or do not have the Uber mobile app installed on their phone. Ola Cabs announced a similar arrangement on 22 February 2017.

Depots 
Under phase-1, two depots were built at Baiyyappanahalli and Peenya. For the line extensions in phase-2, BMRC is building additional depots at Anjanapura on the Green Line and at Challaghatta and Kadugodi for the Purple Line. For the new lines in phase-2, depots are being built at Kothanur (Pink Line) and at Hebbagodi (Yellow Line).

For the Blue Line (airport line, phase-2A), the Baiyyappanahalli depot is planned to be used as two depots are being built for Purple Line at its ends. In addition, a depot is planned at Doddajala, near the Trumpet inter-change. The depot at Baiyappanahalli has an operations control center for managing the metro network and also a training center.

Vertical gardens
The BMRC granted permission to Hydrobloom, a start-up company, to grow hydroponic plants on the pillars of the Namma Metro. Pillars covered with plants are referred to as vertical gardens. Hydrobloom had previously developed a vertical garden on a metro pillar near Rangoli Art Centre next to the MG Road Metro station. The gardens are intended for beautification and to reduce air pollution.

Safety
, BMRCL has two road-cum-rail rescue vehicles that can be used to perform evacuations or re-load derailed trains back onto the track.

The trains are equipped with derailment prevention equipment, and the tracks are equipped with concrete barriers to prevent trains from leaving the viaduct. The support pillars are earthquake-proof and are designed to have a lifespan of at least 100 years. Trains are equipped with sensors to detect impending collisions, and have automatic braking systems to prevent speed limits from being exceeded. In case of train stoppages midway between stations during emergencies, pavements beside tracks are provided on elevated viaducts as well as in underground sections.

Accessibility
Yellow tactile tiles are used at all stations to guide the visually impaired. The tiles start at the ramp and lead to the staircases and lifts. Disabled and elderly passengers can avail a wheelchair at all metro stations. The wheelchair can be used by the passenger to board a train and then dropped off at the destination station. In February 2017, BBMP and BMRC began a project to upgrade all footpaths along metro routes. The project is estimated to cost 40 crore and was scheduled to be completed in 18 months.

Rainwater harvesting
BMRCL, in a public-private partnership, harvests rainwater from the viaducts on the rail system. The private partner, Karnataka Rural Infrastructure Development (KRIDL), collects the water at multiple points, treats it, and sells it in bulk as potable water. Pipes inside each metro viaduct pillar carry the rainwater from the viaduct down to underground tanks located beneath the median. When these tanks overflow, the water is diverted to 5 metres deep rainwater harvesting pits. Two rainwater harvesting pits are installed between each pillar. The average distance between the two pillars is 28 meters. Around 8 crore litres of water are expected to be collected annually.

BMRCL also harvests rainwater from the 140 acres depot facility at Peenya. Water will be collected from the  sq foot roof and stored in two tanks with a capacity of 50,000 litres each. Rainwater harvesting is also planned in existing and under-construction stations. The water harvested will be supplied to places where needed, and any excess will be used for groundwater recharge.

BMRC has installed a water harvesting system along Reach 1 and will be doing the same for Reaches 3 & 4. Installation of flower beds was delayed due to garbage being dumped on the median by garbage collectors, BMRC will also set up flower beds on Reach 1 with assistance from the horticulture department. However, the work related to this has slowed down due to garbage contractors dumping garbage along the median, due to the lack of a waste management plan in the city. BMRC also planned to rejuvenate Kengeri and Veerasandra lakes using water collected from a nearby corridor.

Operations

Fare collection

MIFARE DESFire platform, developed by NXP Semiconductors, was selected to manage the Automated Fare Collection (AFC) for Namma Metro. The system uses contactless smart tokens and contactless smart card. Tokens are available only for a single journey. Smart cards can be used for multiple journeys. There is currently one type of smart card available on the metro – Varshik.

Varshik is priced at 50, with ₹50 as a user deposit. It is valid for a year, and provides a 5% discount on fares. The card can be recharged.
Saral was available for 70. It permitted one day's travel on BMTC non-air-conditioned buses and on the metro. Saral is no longer available.
Saraag was available for 110. It permitted one day's travel on BMTC air-conditioned buses and on the metro. Saraag is no longer available.
Sanchar was available in denominations of 10, 40, 50 and 100. Sanchar was withdrawn from 1 March 2017.
BMRCL began selling tokens through automatic ticket vending machines (ATVMs) on 4 December 2012 at MG Road, Indiranagar and Baiyyappanahalli stations. The service will eventually be expanded to all metro stations. The touchscreen-enabled ATVMs are available in 3 languages – English, Kannada, and Hindi. Commuters can purchase a single journey token by selecting the destination station or the amount in the ATVM. They can also add value or add trips to the contactless smart card. Commuters can purchase up to 8 tickets at a time and can get the receipt printer for card recharge. ATVMs accept coins of 5 and 10 denominations and 10, 20, 50, 100, 500 denominations of currency notes. However, the ATVM cannot differentiate between 1 and 2 coins.

In November 2016, BMRC began accepting online payments to recharge smart cards. Tickets cannot be purchased online. Approximately 68% of passengers on the metro use smart tokens and 32% use smart cards.

Metro system in Bengaluru charges full fare tickets for children above 3yrs of age which is against the Indian government circular date 6 March 2020, No. TC-II/2910/2016/child fare/VIP. Circular number 12 states that "Children under five years of age shall be carried free and purchase of any ticket is not required". "In case of children of age 5 years to under 12 years of age (in case of no berth) only half of the applicable fare shall be charged and in this case, a minimum distance of charge shall not be applicable". (CC30 of 2017 dated 24 April 2017). Similarly Karnataka government public transport system does not collect fares from children under the age of 6 yrs and half fares from children under 12 yrs of age. Unfortunately Bengaluru metro decided to include 3 ft as a criterion to decide who is classified as a child. The average age of Indian babies at 3 yrs is much more than 90 cms. Since BMRCL is a joint venture of the Government of India and the Government of Karnataka, it should be expected to follow Government of India/ Karnataka rules.

Frequency
The metro service runs between 05:00 and 23:00 hours. The service starts at 07:00 hours on Sundays. There are trains every 8 minutes between 08:00 and 20:00, and every 10 minutes at other times. On weekdays, trains operate at 4-minute intervals between 09:00 and 10:00. The headway is slated to decrease to once every three minutes after completion of Phase I. The end-to-end travel time on the Purple Line is 35 minutes, and on the Green Line 45 minutes.

Metro services have occasionally operated beyond 23:00 hours. Services are usually extended on festival days or when an international cricket match is held in the city.

Ridership
The Purple Line's Reach-1 of 6.7 km was the first to open during October 2011. On the first 3 days of operations of Reach-1, 169,019 people rode the metro. At the end of the 4th day, about 200,000 passengers had already commuted on Namma Metro. During the first month since opening of Reach-1, about 1,325,000 people had travelled by metro. Thus, on average, 41,390 people took the train each day during the first month. However, the average ridership during the first six months of operation dipped down to 24,968.

The northern section of Green Line (Reach 3,3A - 9.9 km) opened during March 2014. About 25,000 passengers travelled on the northern section on the opening day. In the first month of operations of the Green Line stretch, 762,000 people used the line, at a daily average of 24,605.

Reach-1, Reach-3/3A and Reach-2 (opened during November 2015) operated independently until the east–west underground section of Purple Line (connecting Reaches 1 and 2) was opened during April 2016. Once the east and west reaches were inter-connected with the intermediate underground section of Purple line, ridership surged hugely to nearly 100,000 a day on the line in the first few days. After the north–south underground section was opened (simultaneously with the elevated reaches 4,4A in the south), the network provided connectivity in all four directions with interchange between the lines and this increased ridership further, reaching between 350,000 and 360,000 on average by December 2017.

As ridership kept growing, overcrowding became a serious concern. Hence, 3-coach trains were converted to 6 coaches. The first six car train was introduced on the Purple Line on 23 June 2018. By January 2020, all trains had been converted to six coaches.

During 2019–20, the annual ridership was 174.22 million (average during the year was thus 477,315). The maximum daily ridership of 601,164 was on 25 October 2019 while the highest daily revenue of Rs.1.67 crore was on 2 March 2020. During January 2020, ridership averaged 518,074.

Due to Covid pandemic, services were halted from 25 March 2020 onwards. Operations resumed on 7 September 2020. During the second wave, operations were again halted from 27 April 2021 to 20 June 2021. Services remained limited throughout the pandemic period and ridership was low due to enforcement of constrained capacity and social distancing norms, as stipulated by the state government.

Speed

Security
The Karnataka State Industrial Security Force (KISF) is responsible for security on the Namma Metro. Bangalore Police conducted detailed mock drills at metro stations for the first time on 25 March 2017. Police officials stated that the drill was to assess readiness to deal with situations such as hoax bomb calls, terrorist infiltration, or attacks. Sniffer dogs, bomb detection and disposal squad, anti-sabotage squad, and Quick Reaction Teams (QRTs) were involved in the drill. Police had previously conducted basic mock drills, but this was the first one aimed toward dealing with specific threats. The chosen day was a Saturday, when crowds are usually larger, in order to make the drill more challenging for officers. The BMRCL had not informed of the drill in advance.

Laws
The Bangalore Metro Rail (Carriage and Ticket) Rules 2011 limit the weight of personal baggage to 15 kg. Rule 3 says: "No person shall, while traveling in metro railway, carry with him any goods other than small baggage containing personal belongings not exceeding 60cm x 45cm x 25cm in size and 15kg in weight, except with the prior approval of the metro railway administration." The rules also prohibit carrying explosive, inflammable, and poisonous substances.

The Metro Railway (Operations and Maintenance) Act, 2002, imposes fines and in some cases jail sentences for offences committed on the metro. Anyone indulging in sabotaging the train or maliciously hurting or attempting to hurt other passengers while travelling in the metro can face imprisonment for up to 10 years. Pasting posters or drawing graffiti on the walls of stations or trains is punishable by a fine of 1,000 or imprisonment for up to 6 months. Traveling in an inebriated state or creating nuisance in the train is punishable by a 500 fine. Passengers are monitored at security checkpoints and those that are causing trouble, heavily drunk, or carrying forbidden items are not permitted to board. Spitting on the metro premises is punishable by a fine of 100.

Mobile app
The BMRCL launched a Namma Metro app for Android devices in 2013. However, it had limited features. The app was officially re-launched on 4 November 2016 with additional features. The app was developed by the Centre for Development of Advanced Computing (CDAC). The app allows users to purchase and recharge smart cards, locate nearby metro stations and also provides information related to parking, train frequency, route map, and fare details.

Future expansion

Proposed routes

To meet the growing traffic demands, a  Phase 3 was initially proposed in May 2016. Certain significant sections that were proposed for Phase 3 were included in Phase 2 as Phase 2A and Phase 2B for 58.19 km.

In December 2019, BMRCL unveiled a Comprehensive Mobility Plan as tabled below for subsequent phases:

Phase 3
On 7 March 2020 it was announced that two corridors totaling 44.65 km will be implemented as a fully elevated system.  under PPP mode with the target to complete the construction within 2027. On 4 March 2022, during budget speech by the state government, a new corridor spanning 35 km from Hebbal to Sarjapura was announced. The Chief Minister stated that action would be taken to prepare the Detailed Project Report (DPR) for the proposed corridor estimated to cost around ₹15,000 crores. The DPR of the 44.65 km two corridors announced earlier will be submitted to the Central Government for approval. The two corridors Hebbal Kempapura to JP Nagar (along ORR on the west) and Hosahalli to Kadabagere were estimated to cost ₹13,500 crores. Thus Phase 3 will be likely for a total of 80 km.

Phase 4
On 10 March 2023, government of Karnataka announced an action plan to make the state one trillion dollar economy which included a proposal for four new metro corridors. The new corridors costing ₹27,000 crores would add 59 kms of length to the system and will lead to the government's target of making metro accessible to every citizen within one to two kilometres by 2032.

In popular culture
Several films and commercials have been shot on the Namma Metro premises. During non-peak hours, from 10 pm to 4 am, the agency charges  for shoots inside metro stations and  inside a train. Film shoots are permitted during three slots – 6 to 8 am, 12 pm to 2 pm, and 9 to 11 pm. Kannada films can avail lower rates.

The first film to shoot on Namma Metro was the Kannada blockbuster Ugramm in 2013. Later many other Kannada movies including 2015 film Rana Vikrama starring Puneeth Rajkumar and Adah Sharma, were shot using Namma Metro's facilities.

The 2012 Malayalam film 22 Female Kottayam, starring Fahadh Faasil and Rima Kallingal also has a song sequence shot in the Namma Metro coach.

In December 2016, Tamil film Imaikkaa Nodigal, starring Nayanthara became the first film to shoot scenes inside the tunnel stretch of the Purple Line. According to BMRC officials, prior to this film, one Kannada film, one Telugu film and several commercials had been shot on the Namma Metro premises.

In February 2017 a mobile game based on Namma Metro was released. It is called the Bangalore Metro Simulator 2017, which includes users to drive both Purple Line and Green Line. But the game is now not available in Google Play.

Controversies 
In August 2021, the Karnataka government requested large corporations with offices on the Outer Ring Road (ORR) to consider extending remote work policies until the end of 2022 to reduce traffic congestion during the soon-to-be initiated Metro rail construction on the stretch from Silk Board to KR Puram. Due to questions raised by IT companies and employees awaiting return to their offices, the government issued a clarification that it was not mandatory.

On 10 January 2023, an under-construction metro pillar casing on the ORR stretch of the Blue Line collapsed, leading to the death of a woman and her child. Several officials of the BMRCL and the Nagarjuna Construction Company (with whom the BMRCL had a contract with) have been booked. This has led to allegations of corruption and negligence of the civic bodies by the media.

Network Map

See also
 Urban rail transit in India
 Bengaluru Metropolitan Land Transport Authority (BMLTA) Bill, 2022
 BMRCL
 Purple Line
 Green Line
 Yellow Line
 Pink Line
 Blue Line
 Orange Line
 List of Namma Metro stations
 Rangoli Metro Art Center
 List of metro systems

References

External links 

 Official website (English)
 Official website (Kannada)
 Phase I Detailed Project Report (DPR)
 Phase II DPR Executive Summary
 Outer Ring Road metro DPR

 
Standard gauge railways in India
750 V DC railway electrification
2011 establishments in Karnataka